Swearingen may refer to:

Swearingen Aircraft, or one of several aircraft manufactured by this company and its successors, including:
Swearingen Merlin, a twin turboprop business aircraft
Fairchild Swearingen Metroliner, a twin turboprop airliner
Sino Swearingen SJ30-2, a business jet
Other aircraft bearing the Swearingen name:
 Swearingen SX-300, a homebuilt aircraft kit
 John J. Swearingen House, a historic home in Bartow, Florida
 Van Swearingen-Shepherd House, a historic mansion in Shepherdstown, West Virginia

People with the surname
Ed Swearingen (1925–2014), American aeronautical engineer
Ellis Alfred Swearingen (1845-1904), also known as Al Swearengen, American pimp and saloon owner
Fred Swearingen, American official in American football
Henry Swearingen (1790s–1849), American politician from Ohio
James Swearingen, American composer
Judson S. Swearingen (1907–1999), American entrepreneur and inventor
Leroy Swearingen,  American musician, member of The Stereos
M. Wesley Swearingen (1927-2019), American law enforcement agent and writer
Rob Swearingen (born 1963), American businessman and politician
Terri Swearingen, American nurse
Thomas Van Swearingen (1784–1822), American politician from Virginia
Victor C. Swearingen, American judge, alternate judge in the Doctors' trial